The phoenix has provided the name for a number of songs, often incorporating the mythological bird's theme of rebirth. Following is a list of songs so named:

 "Phoenix", a 2019 promotional single by League of Legends, Cailin Russo, and Chrissy Costanza for the 2019 League of Legends World Championship.
 "Phoenix", by Breaking Point from Coming Of Age.
 "Phoenix", by Satyricon, from Satyricon.
 "Phoenix" (ASAP Rocky song).
 "Phoenix", by Morissette.
 "Le Phénix" by Michel Corrette, concerto.
 "Phoenix", by Decoded Feedback, from Shockwave.
 "Phoenix", by Breaking Pangaea, from Phoenix.
 "Phoenix", by Daft Punk, from Homework.
 "Phoenix," by Dan Fogelberg, from Phoenix.
 "The Phoenix", by Fall Out Boy, from Save Rock and Roll.
 "The Phoenix", by Labelle, from Phoenix.
 "Phoenix", by Magic Carpet, from Magic Carpet.
 "Phoenix", by The Prodigy, from Always Outnumbered, Never Outgunned.
 "Phenix" by Sentenced, from Amok.
 "Phoenix", by Stratovarius, from Infinite.
 "Phoenix", by Veil of Maya, from Matriarch.
 "Phoenix", by Wishbone Ash, from Wishbone Ash.
 "Phoenix", by Wolfmother, from Cosmic Egg.
 "The Phoenix", by Pepper, from Pink Crustaceans and Good Vibrations.
 "Phoenix", by The Cult, from Love.
 "Phoenix", by Nelly Furtado, from The Ride.
 "Phoenix", by The Butterfly Effect.
 "Phoenix", by Molly Sandén.
 "Phœnix", by Daft Punk.
 "Phoenix", by Basement Jaxx, Which was a Remixed Version of Daft Punk's Song of the Same Name, Featured on Daft Punk's 2003 Remix Album "Daft Club".
 "Phoenix", by Scandroid, from The Darkness.
 "The Phoenix" by Pyramid, featured in the Horizon Pulse radio station in the 2014 open-world racing video game Forza Horizon 2.
 "Phoenix", by Santti, Diskover, and Matthew Parker.
 "Phoenix", by Netrum and Halvorsen.
 "Phoenix", by Big Red Machine featuring Fleet Foxes and Anaïs Mitchell from How Long Do You Think It's Gonna Last?

See also
 Phoenix (disambiguation)